Byron Area Historic Museum is a museum in Byron Center, Michigan, United States. The Byron Center Historical Society is a non profit organization and was originally formed in 1978 primarily for Genealogy research. In 1986 The Historical Society obtained the “Township Hall”, a State Historical Landmark, to utilize for a museum and to house the genealogy archives. Exhibits include period business displays including a general store, post office, doctor's office, a period house with different rooms, displays on logging and farming, area veterans, a church and a one-room schoolhouse.

Downstairs: General Store; Post Office; Doctor's Office; Large Farming Display; Logging Display

External links 
 Byron Area Historic Museum website

Museums in Kent County, Michigan
History museums in Michigan
Historical societies in Michigan
Museums established in 1978
1978 establishments in Michigan